Verdi is a census-designated place (CDP) in Sierra County, California. The 2010 United States census reported Verdi's population was 162. It is just across the state line from Verdi, Nevada and below the Verdi Range.

The town of Verdi was named after Giuseppe Verdi by Charles Crocker, founder of the Central Pacific Railroad, when he pulled a slip of paper from a hat and read the name of the Italian opera composer in 1868.

Geography

Demographics
The 2010 United States Census reported that Verdi had a population of 162. The racial makeup of Verdi was 153 (94.4%) White, 0 (0.0%) African American, 0 (0.0%) Native American, 1 (0.6%) Asian, 0 (0.0%) Pacific Islander, 5 (3.1%) from other races, and 3 (1.9%) from two or more races. Hispanic or Latino of any race were 10 persons (6.2%).

The Census reported that 162 people (100% of the population) lived in households, 0 (0%) lived in non-institutionalized group quarters, and 0 (0%) were institutionalized.

There were 78 households, out of which 12 (15.4%) had children under the age of 18 living in them, 45 (57.7%) were opposite-sex married couples living together, 4 (5.1%) had a female householder with no husband present, 3 (3.8%) had a male householder with no wife present.  There were 3 (3.8%) unmarried opposite-sex partnerships, and 0 (0%) same-sex married couples or partnerships. 23 households (29.5%) were made up of individuals, and 13 (16.7%) had someone living alone who was 65 years of age or older. The average household size was 2.08.  There were 52 families (66.7% of all households); the average family size was 2.48.

The population was spread out, with 14 people (8.6%) under the age of 18, 6 people (3.7%) aged 18 to 24, 27 people (16.7%) aged 25 to 44, 75 people (46.3%) aged 45 to 64, and 40 people (24.7%) who were 65 years of age or older.  The median age was 55.8 years. For every 100 females, there were 116.0 males.  For every 100 females age 18 and over, there were 117.6 males.

There were 89 housing units at an average density of 21.3 per square mile (8.2/km), of which 68 (87.2%) were owner-occupied, and 10 (12.8%) were occupied by renters. The homeowner vacancy rate was 2.9%; the rental vacancy rate was 0%.  146 people (90.1% of the population) lived in owner-occupied housing units and 16 people (9.9%) lived in rental housing units.

Government

Fire protection for Verdi, CA is provided by the Verdi Volunteer Fire Department.

References

Census-designated places in Sierra County, California
Census-designated places in California
Giuseppe Verdi